Rashid Khan Was an Indian actor. He appeared in more than sixty films between 1949 and 1976.  His best roles were played with Dev Anand right from Afsar, Navketan Films's first production and went on to work together in hits like Tere Ghar Ke Samne, "Bombai ka Babu" and Kaala Bazar, in which he played key roles. They worked together till 1973 film Banarasi Babu.

In other films like Baazi, House No. 44, and Nau Do Gyarah he played smaller roles. All his films with Dev Anand were hits. He acted as "Raddiwala Kaka" in Shree 420 in 1955, alongside Raj Kapoor.

Selected filmography

References

External links
 

Indian male film actors
Place of birth missing
Year of birth missing
Male actors in Hindi cinema
20th-century Indian male actors